The Wood, later Page Wood Baronetcy, of Hatherley House in the County of Gloucester, is a title in the Baronetage of the United Kingdom. It was created on 16 December 1837 for Matthew Wood, Lord Mayor of London from 1815 to 1817 and Whig Member of Parliament for the City of London from 1817 to 1843. The fifth Baronet assumed the additional surname of Page. Two other members of the family have also gained distinction. William Wood, 1st Baron Hatherley, Lord High Chancellor of Great Britain from 1868 to 1872, was the second son of the first Baronet while Field Marshal Sir Evelyn Wood was the fifth son of the second Baronet. Also, Katharine O'Shea, known for her relationship with Charles Stewart Parnell, was the daughter of the second Baronet. The theosophist and political activist Annie Besant (born Annie Wood), was the great-granddaughter of the 1st Baronet's father.

The 1st Baronet was descended from the Wood family of Hareston in the parish of Brixton in Devon, which the family had inherited by marriage to the heiress of the Carslake family. The Page-Wood baronets quarter the arms of Carslake Argent, a bull's head erased sable.

Wood baronets, of Hatherley House (1837)
Sir Matthew Wood, 1st Baronet (1768–1843)
Rev Sir John Page Wood, 2nd Baronet (1796–1866)
Sir Francis Wood, 3rd Baronet (1834–1868)
Sir Matthew Wood, 4th Baronet (1857–1908)
Sir John Page Wood, 5th Baronet (1860–1912)
Sir John Stuart Page Wood, 6th Baronet (1898–1955)
Sir John Hatherley David Page Wood, 7th Baronet (1921–1955)
Sir Anthony John Page Wood, 8th Baronet (born 1951)

See also
Page baronets
Wood baronets

Notes

References
Kidd, Charles, Williamson, David (editors). Debrett's Peerage and Baronetage (1990 edition). New York: St Martin's Press, 1990, 

Painting of Sir Matthew Wood, 1st Baronet, at the National Portrait Gallery

Baronetcies in the Baronetage of the United Kingdom
Wood family